This uniform polyhedron compound is a composition of 10 truncated tetrahedra, formed by truncating each of the tetrahedra in the compound of 10 tetrahedra. It also results from composing the two enantiomers of the compound of 5 truncated tetrahedra.

Cartesian coordinates 
Cartesian coordinates for the vertices of this compound are all the even permutations of

 (±1, ±1, ±3)
 (±τ−1, ±(−τ−2), ±2τ)
 (±τ, ±(−2τ−1), ±τ2)
 (±τ2, ±(−τ−2), ±2)
 (±(2τ−1), ±1, ±(2τ − 1))

where τ = (1+)/2 is the golden ratio (sometimes written φ).

References 
.

Polyhedral compounds